The Good Life or Good Life may refer to:

Film
 The Good Life (1996 film), a Spanish film by David Trueba
 The Good Life (1997 film), an American crime comedy film
 The Good Life (2007 film), a Canadian-American film by Stephen Berra
 The Good Life (2008 film), a Chilean film directed by Andrés Wood

Literature
 The Good Life (novel), a 2006 novel by Jay McInerney
 The Good Life, a 2014 novel by Martina Cole
 The Good Life, a 1969 novel by Douglass Wallop
 The Good Life, a 2012 nonfiction book by Trip Lee
 The Good Life, a 1989 nonfiction book by Helen Nearing and Scott Nearing
 The Good Life: The Autobiography of Tony Bennett, a 1998 book by Tony Bennett
 A Good Life, the 1995 autobiography of Ben Bradlee

Music

Performers
 The Good Life (band), an American rock band
 The Good Life, a 1990s American rock band featuring Dave Tweedie and Stephen Bradley

Albums
 The Good Life (Andy Griggs album), 2008
 The Good Life (FUBU album) or the title song, 2001
 The Good Life (Justin Townes Earle album) or the title song, 2008
 The Good Life (Kashmir album), 1999
 The Good Life (Oscar Peterson album), 1974
 The Good Life (Railroad Earth album), 2004
 The Good Life (Trip Lee album), 2012
 The Good Life (Willis Jackson album), 1963
 The Good Life, by Stereo Skyline, 2011
 The Good Life, by Till Brönner, 2016
 Good Life (album), by Collie Buddz, 2017
 Good Life: The Best of Pete Rock & CL Smooth, 2003

EPs
 The Good Life, by Howlin' Rain, 2010
 The Good Life or the title song, by Tim Myers, 2008

Songs
 "The Good Life" (1962 song), a popular song recorded by Tony Bennett and many others
 "The Good Life" (The Band Perry song), 2019
 "The Good Life" (The Collective song), 2014
 "The Good Life" (Three Days Grace song), 2009
 "The Good Life" (Weezer song), 1996
 "Good Life" (The Braxtons song), 1990
 "Good Life" (G-Eazy and Kehlani song), 2017
 "Good Life" (Inner City song), 1988
 "Good Life" (Kanye West song), 2007
 "Good Life" (OneRepublic song), 2009
 "The Good Life", by Chiddy Bang from The Preview, 2010
 "The Good Life", by Hannah Montana from the Hannah Montana: The Movie soundtrack, 2009
 "The Good Life", by the New Power Generation from Exodus, 1995
 "The Good Life", by Robin Thicke from Blurred Lines, 2013
 "The Good Life", by Trent Willmon from Trent Willmon, 2004
 "Good Life", by 2Pac from Until the End of Time, 2001
 "Good Life", by Audio Adrenaline from Underdog, 1999
 "Good Life", by Faith Evans from The Fast and the Furious soundtrack, 2001
 "Good Life", by Forever the Sickest Kids from Forever the Sickest Kids, 2011
 "Good Life", by Francis Dunnery from The Gulley Flats Boys, 2005
 "Good Life", by Jesse McCartney from Beautiful Soul, 2004
 "Good Life", by Kylie Minogue, a B-side of "Please Stay", 2000
 "Good Life", by Oliver Heldens, 2016
 "Good Life", by Therese Merkel, 2021

Television
 The Good Life (1971 TV series), an American sitcom starring Larry Hagman
 The Good Life (1975 TV series), a British sitcom starring Richard Briers and Felicity Kendall
 The Good Life (1994 TV series), an American sitcom starring John Caponera and Drew Carey
 "The Good Life" (The Jeffersons), an episode
 The Good Life: Brits in France, a reality TV show from Channel 5 previously known as Allo Allo: Brits in France.
 WTGL, broadcasting as "Good Life 45", a TV station in Orlando, Florida

Other
 The Good Life (video game), a 2021 role-playing game
 Good Life Cafe, a health-food market and cafe in Los Angeles, California, noted for its 1990s open-mic nights
 Good Life Recordings, a Belgian record label
 GoodLife Fitness, a Canadian health club company

See also
 La Buena Vida (lit. The Good Life), a Spanish indie pop group
 La Dolce Vita (lit. "the sweet life" or "the good life"), a 1960 Italian film
 Eudaimonia, a philosophical term for the highest human good, originally associated with Aristotle
 The Rights of Nature in Ecuador - Sumak Kawsay or buen vivir ("good living")
 The Good Wife, an American television drama
 Life Is Good (disambiguation)